Manistee was a packet steamer that disappeared on Lake Superior on November 15 or 16, 1883. She was presumed to have sunk, with no surviving crew or passengers. The cause remains a mystery, and her wreckage has not been found.

History
Manistee was built in 1867 by E. M. Peck Shipbuilders, of Cleveland, Ohio.

Originally, the vessel was operated by the Engelman Line and carried cargo and passengers between her home port of Milwaukee, Wisconsin, and her namesake city, Manistee, Michigan. In 1872, the ship came to Duluth, Minnesota, and she eventually was put in service for the Leopold and Austrian Line, her final owners.

The long and interesting career of Manistee came to an end on an autumn Saturday in 1883, when the ship left Duluth for Ontonagon, Michigan. The 400 tons of cargo included items such as flour, mill goods, furniture, and general merchandise. Shortly after she left Duluth, a violent northwest gale developed on the western portion of Lake Superior. Her captain, John McKay, decided to seek temporary shelter near Bayfield, Wisconsin, until the winds subsided. The storm lasted for four days. On the fifth day of his Bayfield stay, McKay decided to venture back out towards Ontonagon. However, this proved to be a mistake, as the ship disappeared somewhere near the Apostle Islands after leaving Bayfield.

The cause of the sinking, the location of the wreck, and even the exact number of missing passengers is in question. Different theories as to the ship′s fate were discussed in an article in the Bayfield County Press on November 24, 1883, when the story was first reported by the local media.

See also
List of shipwrecks in the Great Lakes

References

1867 ships
Ships built in Cleveland
Great Lakes freighters
Maritime incidents in November 1883
Shipwrecks of the Wisconsin coast
Shipwrecks of Lake Superior
Ships lost with all hands
Apostle Islands
Missing ships